Brionvega is an Italian electronics company that is known for manufacturing futuristic television sets and audio equipment, its contributions to post-second world war technological and social advancement in Italian industry, collaborations with well known industrial designers and architects, and its impact on the aesthetics of 1960s Italian design.

History

Initially named B.P.M. Radio, then changed to Vega BP Radio, and finally "BRIONVEGA", when the company was rebranded in 1963.

In 1954 Brionvega introduced the first Italian made television sets after entering into a contract with the country's national broadcaster RAI.

In the early 1960s Brionvega began working with notable architects and industrial designers including Franco Albini, Sergio Asti, brothers Achille, Livio, and Pier Giacomo Castiglioni, Mario Bellini, Richard Sapper, and Marco Zanuso. These collaborations resulted in a decade of design innovation and the introduction of products such as the Algol 11 and Doney 14 television sets, TS 502 "Cubo" radio, the  radiogram, which was introduced in 1966, followed by the "Cubo" television in 1969.

The designs that the company manufactured during this period were recognised in their time with awards such as the Compasso d'Oro and Biennale of Design (BIO), and have since become regarded as icons of 1960s Italian design. Domus magazine has stated that, "You could write a telling history of Italian post-war industrial design almost entirely through the products of Brionvega".

An updated version of the original Cubo television was produced in 1992 with the same exterior casing and updated electronics. Two of the other 1960s products, the Doney and Algol television sets, were also re-issued in limited edition runs. The TS 502 portable radio and the RR 126 radiogram have both been re-issued and updated in several different versions.

Brinonvega has gone through several changes of ownership since, and as of 2022 was still active marketing re-editions of the designs from its 1960s and 1970s heyday, as well as some more recent products.

The University of Parma holds a large collection of archival material relating to the company including sketches, drawings, prototypes, examples of Brionvega products, brochures and advertising materials. The National Museum of Science and Technology in Milan also holds a number of Brionvega products in its collection.

In 2016 a Brionvega RR 126 radiogram once owned by the singer David Bowie was sold by Sotheby's in London for £257,000.

Gallery

Designer

Notes

Publications

 Carugati, Decio Giulio Riccardo (2003). Brionvega: progetto l'emozione. Milano: Electa. ISBN 88-370-2107-0. OCLC 799426220.

See also

Telecommunications collection, Museum of Science and Technology, Milan
Clamshell design
List of companies of Italy

References

External links

Brionvega company website
Super//Fluo company website
Brionvega information at Radiomuseum.org
Fondazione Fiera Milano, historical archives showing archival photographs of 1960s trade fair (in Italian)
Asolo (Tv) Radio e televisori della Brionvega in mostra, brief emission about 2022 Brionvega exhibition in Asolo, Italy (in Italian)

Electronics companies established in 1945
Italian companies established in 1945
Electronics companies of Italy
Design companies of Italy
Science and technology in Italy
Industrial design firms
Industrial design
Telecommunications companies of Italy
Italian brands
Design

Compasso d'Oro Award recipients